Jiazhou or Jia Prefecture was a zhou (prefecture) in imperial China seated in modern Leshan, Sichuan, China. It existed (intermittently) from the 6th century to 1196. Between 742 and 758 (during the Tang dynasty) it was known as Qianwei Commandery (犍為郡).

Geography
The administrative region of Jiazhou in the Tang dynasty is under the administration of modern Leshan in southeastern Sichuan: 
 Leshan
 Emeishan City
 Jiajiang County
 Qianwei County
 Muchuan County
 Mabian Yi Autonomous County
 Ebian Yi Autonomous County

References

Citations

Bibliography
 
 
 

Prefectures of the Sui dynasty
Prefectures of the Tang dynasty
Prefectures of the Song dynasty
Prefectures of Former Shu
Prefectures of Later Shu
Prefectures of Later Tang
Former prefectures in Sichuan